The Datsun Type 14 was a small Japanese car introduced in February 1935 and built until 1936. It had a  sidevalve engine and was offered in several body styles. According to Britain's National Motor Museum at Beaulieu, the Type 14 "marked the birth of the Japanese car industry."

Design

The Datsun 14 was externally very similar to the preceding Datsun Type 13. The only notable difference was the addition of a leaping rabbit emblem. The brand Datsun is derived from the DAT car of 1914.

.
Fortuitously,  also means to "dash off like a startled rabbit or hare". Nissan decided to use this association to incorporate a rabbit into the design of the Datsun 14 and therefore Ryuichi Tomiya designed the leaping rabbit radiator mascot which became a defining characteristic of the type.

Production
The Datsun 14 was the first car that Nissan produced at their new plant in Yokohama.  The factory utilised many tools and techniques imported from the United States and enabled the company to assemble both bodies and chassis in the same factory for the first time. The first vehicle rolled off the production line on 12 April 1935.

Production numbers
A total of 3,800 Datsun 14 were produced between April 1935 and April 1936, of which 53 were exported. The car was similar in styling to the Austin 7, which greatly helped exports, initially to Australia and, in 1936, to New Zealand.

Datsun 14T
Nissan produced the Datsun 14T commercial vehicle based on the Datsun 14 at the same factory during the same period. The truck had a front section identical to the 14, including the rabbit radiator mascot and chrome plated grille.

References

Type 14
Rear-wheel-drive vehicles
Cars introduced in 1935
Nissan trucks